Seyfollah Mirza (Persian:سیف‌الله میرزا) (born:2/7/1814) was a Qajar prince and 42nd son of Fath-Ali Shah Qajar. His mother was Golbadan Baji (also known by her honorific Khazen-ol-Dowleh). In 1836, he was appointed as ruler of Semnan. In 1855, he was appointed as ruler of Qazvin and afterward Tuyserkan and Malayer. His descendants achieved high military posts. He was the father of Taj al-Dawlah.

References 

Qajar princes
19th-century Iranian politicians
Qajar governors
Iranian people of Georgian descent